WSAU (550 kHz) is an AM radio station broadcasting a conservative talk format serving Wausau, Wisconsin, United States, area, and simulcasted on WSAU-FM (99.9) in Stevens Point (licensed to Rudolph). The station is owned by Wausau-based Midwest Communications, with studios on Scott Street. The WSAU transmitter is located along County Highway X in Kronenwetter, Wisconsin.

The station today bearing the WSAU name started as WLIN in Merrill, Wisconsin, in 1948, preceded the year before by an FM station (now WIFC). It was owned by United States Representative Alvin E. O'Konski. It moved to Wausau in 1952 as that city's second radio station. WSAU, then at 1400 AM, acquired the frequency in 1958 in a facility upgrade. Midwest has owned WSAU since 1996.

History

Establishment in Merrill as WLIN
Alvin E. O'Konski applied to the Federal Communications Commission (FCC) on February 3, 1947, to build a new radio station at Merrill, Wisconsin. At the time, O'Konski was a sitting United States representative; another member of Wisconsin's Congressional delegation, Joseph McCarthy, introduced a bill months later proposing to bar members of Congress or their spouses from owning radio stations. McCarthy claimed not to have knowledge of the O'Konski applications for AM and FM stations at Merrill, while O'Konski told a reporter that it was "honorable and legal" for a lawmaker to own a station. The application was amended that November to switch from a 500-watt station with unlimited time on 1230 kHz to a 1,000-watt, daytime-only station at 730 kHz, and it was granted on June 16, 1948; construction was quickly completed, and the station was reported on air by August 8. The FM application had already been granted and went on the air as WLIN-FM 100.7 on a limited basis. However, its operation was pockmarked with technical difficulties; equipment that was shipped to Merrill arrived damaged and several sections of transmission line needed replacement.

O'Konski applied in 1949 to change frequencies to 550 kHz and add nighttime operation; the FCC approved on March 13, 1950. By this time, O'Konski was expanding his broadcasting holdings. He applied for a station in Menominee, Michigan, but another group also applied for the frequency. Further, troubles were mounting. A syndicated column by Drew Pearson noted that one man on O'Konski's congressional payroll actually worked at WLIN, while O'Konski was sued for $17,700 in unpaid transcribed programs used by WLIN; this legal action was settled.

Move to Wausau as WOSA
In 1951, O'Konski applied for a second increase to 5,000 watts, and he amended this application in February 1952 to move the station from Merrill to Wausau. Doubts were raised at the time over whether this would be approved. Wausau already had one station, WSAU (1400 AM), and a construction permit had been issued to build another, WHVF. However, the FCC granted the construction permit to make the move on December 4, 1952; the call sign was changed from WLIN to WOSA on December 15. O'Konski announced program production would be split between Wausau and Merrill. The Merrill studio at this time also served as O'Konski's congressional office: Congress paid O'Konski $900 a year in rent for the space, something he asserted to be a common practice.

The Wausau transmitter site was phased into use in May 1953; the station retained its affiliation with the Mutual Broadcasting System. O'Konski also began exploratory work on a possible television station application, filing for VHF channel 7 at the start of April. WSAU radio, a consortium of newspapers known as the Wisconsin Valley Television Corporation, and WOSA were the three groups seeking the channel. However, seeking to avoid a lengthy comparative hearing, O'Konski amended his application to UHF channel 16, which was granted in February 1954. However, ten months later, O'Konski abandoned the permit for WOSA-TV and returned it to the FCC.

WOSA would not have studios in Wausau until February 1955, when it opened a facility in the Thorp Finance Building at Fourth and Scott streets. O'Konski also announced he would open a station at Stevens Point.

O'Konski made a second attempt to obtain WOSA-TV in 1957. He requested channel 9 be moved to Wausau from Iron Mountain, Michigan, a proposal accepted by the FCC.

WSAU moves to 550
In January 1958, O'Konski reached an agreement with the Wisconsin Valley Television Company (which had merged with WSAU radio in 1953) to sell WOSA and WLIN for $225,000. Wisconsin Valley would retain the WOSA facility and move WSAU onto it, selling off the 250-watt station at 1400 kHz. A buyer was found in May: Duey Wright, the owner of a music store and school of music in Wausau, who would take over the 1400 frequency using the call sign WRIG and set up studios above the music store.

On August 1, 1958, the realignment of radio frequencies portended by the sale became reality. WSAU and its programming moved from 1400 to 550 kHz, incorporating selected WOSA programs, and WRIG debuted at 1400. WLIN became WSAU-FM and then WIFC in 1969. Wausau-based Wisconsin Valley continued to operate under that name until December 1966, when it renamed itself Forward Communications in view of its ownership of KCAU-TV in Sioux City, Iowa.

Forward sold off WSAU and WIFC radio in 1980 to Mid-West Media, a company owned by the stations' general manager, Dave "Raven" Ewaskowitz, and two members of a local insurance company; by this time, WSAU was a full-service adult contemporary and information station. In announcing the sale, Forward noted policies that discouraged cross-ownership of radio and television stations. The radio station retained the WSAU call sign, and the television station became WSAW-TV. The sale closed in April 1981. The radio stations remained in the same building with WSAW-TV until relocating in 1983.

Journal and Midwest ownership
In 1985, Ewaskowitz opted to sell Mid-West Media for approximately $3.5 million to Journal Broadcast Group, the media subsidiary of The Milwaukee Journal. The Journal had owned WSAU on 1400 kHz from 1947 to 1951.

Journal sold the pair for $3.5 million in 1996 to Midwest Communications, owned by the Wright family—which had started in radio by buying the former WSAU frequency 38 years prior. At the time, WSAU broadcast a mix of news/talk programming and oldies.

In 2009, Midwest began simulcasting the station in the Stevens Point area on WSAU-FM 99.9, the former WIZD. It acquired a translator licensed to Marshfield in 2014 to provide an FM signal in the immediate Wausau area.

Programming
The station airs a local morning newscast, WSAU Wisconsin Morning News, on weekdays and also is the home of the Milwaukee Brewers and Green Bay Packers on radio in the region. The remainder of its schedule consists of syndicated conservative talk shows, including The Sean Hannity Show, The Dan Bongino Show, and the regional The Regular Show with Joe Giganti, produced from Green Bay at Midwest's WTAQ.

References

External links
WSAU News Talk Facebook

SAU
News and talk radio stations in the United States
Radio stations established in 1948
1948 establishments in Wisconsin
Midwest Communications radio stations